The Colts Catastrophe was an unsuccessful National Football League (NFL) trick play attempted by the Indianapolis Colts against the New England Patriots on October 18, 2015. It occurred near the end of the third quarter in the teams' Week 6 game of the 2015 NFL season.

The play was called during a Colts' fourth down on their 37-yard line, with three yards needed for a new set of downs. A fake punt, it saw most of the Colts players (including punter Pat McAfee) move from their positions to line up on the other side of the field, leaving only upback Colt Anderson set to receive the ball from gunner Griff Whalen. With the Colts' unusual formation alerting the Patriots to the fake punt before the play began and Anderson virtually unprotected by his teammates, Anderson was almost immediately tackled for a loss after the ball was snapped and New England took over on downs. An illegal formation penalty was also called on the Colts, which the Patriots declined. The Patriots scored a touchdown on the ensuing drive, helping seal their eventual 34–27 victory.

According to McAfee, the play was intended to trick the Patriots into being penalized for having too many men on the field or going offside, which would have resulted in a Colts first down. McAfee said Indianapolis planned on letting the play clock run out after it failed to draw a New England penalty, but a "communications breakdown" led to the ball being snapped. It is regarded as one of the worst trick plays in NFL history due to its poor execution and outcome.

Background
The Colts and Patriots were perennial playoff contenders who had developed an intense rivalry over the years. The Patriots had most recently blown out the Colts in the 2014 AFC Championship Game (before subsequently winning Super Bowl XLIX), in a game marked by the Deflategate scandal. This Week 6 Sunday Night Football game was the first meeting between the two teams since the scandal.

The game featured a back-and-forth first half in which Patriots quarterback Tom Brady threw one touchdown pass and Colts quarterback Andrew Luck threw two. With strong running games and accurate kickers on each side, the Colts led the close contest by only a single point at halftime, 21–20. After Brady threw a touchdown pass to Rob Gronkowski on the Patriots' first drive of the third quarter, the teams traded punts for several possessions. When a Colts possession stalled at their own 37 yard line, the team chose to call for a trick play.

The play
With 1:14 remaining in the third quarter, facing a fourth down with three yards to go on their own 37-yard line, the Colts lined up in a punt formation, with punter Pat McAfee in his usual position. After several moments, most of the Colts' punt team began jogging toward the Indianapolis sideline, but stopped and lined up in an imitation of their punt formation near the outer hash mark. Upback Colt Anderson jogged with them, then ran back toward the ball and lined up as quarterback behind gunner Griff Whalen, who had positioned himself as the new center and was prepared to snap the ball.

The Patriots players initially followed the Colts toward their sideline, but some remained in the area near the ball. Brandon Bolden and Jon Bostic positioned themselves on either side of Whalen in what would normally be called the A-gaps. Whalen snapped the ball with one second remaining on the play clock, and Bolden was immediately on top of Anderson, wrestling him to the ground with the assistance of Tarell Brown for a loss of two yards.

A penalty flag was thrown on the Colts, which referee Tony Corrente announced as an illegal formation penalty, explaining "The whole right side of the line was not on the line of scrimmage." Patriots coach Bill Belichick declined the penalty, giving the Patriots the ball at the Indianapolis 35-yard line.

New England scored a touchdown on the ensuing drive and went on to win the game 34–27.

Reaction
Color commentator Cris Collinsworth cut himself off in mid-thought when the Colts began moving. He and play-by-play announcer Al Michaels reacted to the play with hesitation and confusion.

A nonplussed Collinsworth spent several moments trying to analyze the play, making statements such as, "That was insane," "I've never seen anything more bizarre than that," and "What was the plan?" to which Michaels replied "I don't know. It's completely nuts."

McAfee's explanations
On October 25, 2018 and later on October 18, 2019—the fourth anniversary of the play—punter McAfee provided a detailed explanation of the play on The Pat McAfee Show. According to McAfee, the play was designed to trick the Patriots into committing a penalty. The shift of the special teams players was intended to fool the Patriots into thinking the Colts were about to send the offense back onto the field; the hope was the Patriots would send their defense out on the field, allowing the Colts to catch them with too many men on the field. In this case, the resulting five-yard penalty would give the Colts enough yards for a first down. If that failed, the Colts would simply wait for the play clock to expire, take the five-yard delay of game penalty, and punt normally on the next play.

McAfee claimed that the play was executed flawlessly during practice, but that Whalen was not involved in the practice drills. The player who had initially been assigned the role of snapper, McAfee said, was deactivated on Saturday due to illness, leaving Whalen only a day or so to learn the play. As a result, Whalen read in the playbook that he should snap the ball if the quarterback for the play gets under center. Pagano had apparently told Anderson before the play that he was to use a hard count to try to draw them offside should they fail to catch the defense with too many men on the field. This would also give a first down if successful and was still intended to lead to a delay of game if the Patriots did not commit either penalty.  Whalen was unaware of this last-minute change to the play; McAfee noted that even the other players on the field were not expecting Anderson's hard count. Per McAfee, Whalen was not intended to snap the ball at all during the play. Similarly, Pagano attributed a "communications breakdown" for the play's failure.

Legacy
The Colts finished the year 8–8, one game behind the AFC South champion Houston Texans, beginning a three-year playoff drought. Coach Chuck Pagano was fired in 2017 after two subsequent non-winning seasons.

Football fans on Twitter reacted with strong statements of contempt directed toward the Colts. Internet memes that spread in the immediate aftermath featured Luck, Pagano, and other Colts figures cast as the Three Stooges, along with Hillary Clinton and other political characters.

On the NFL Network's "Top 10 Worst Plays" episode, the Colts Catastrophe was ranked number six.

The Colts Catastrophe was referenced in the SB Nation video "The Worst Trick Play", which deemed the swinging gate play attempted by the Washington Redskins against the New York Giants to be worse. Commentator Will Buikema noted the Colts were seeking to draw a penalty instead of attempting a fake punt, while the Redskins intended to run their play, even after the Giants called a timeout that effectively prevented the Redskins from catching them off-guard.

See also
Colts–Patriots rivalry
Deflategate

References

2015 National Football League season
National Football League games
American football plays
Indianapolis Colts
New England Patriots
American football incidents
October 2015 sports events in the United States
2015 in sports in Indiana
2010s in Indianapolis
American football in Indiana
Tom Brady